NGC 63 is a spiral galaxy in the constellation Pisces. NGC 63 is its New General Catalogue designation. It has an apparent V-band magnitude of 12.70.

Discovery
The galaxy was discovered by Heinrich Louis d'Arrest in 1865.

References

External links
 

Unbarred spiral galaxies
18650827
0063
Discoveries by Heinrich Louis d'Arrest
Pisces (constellation)